Centrella may refer to:
Centrella, a food brand name used by the Central Grocers Cooperative in Illinois
Centrella Inn, a complex of historic buildings in Pacific Grove, California
Joan Centrella, American astrophysicist